Kopitar is a Slovene surname. Notable people with the surname include:

Anže Kopitar (born 1987), Slovenian hockey player
Jernej Kopitar (1780–1844), Slovenian linguist
Matjaž Kopitar (born 1965), Slovenian ice hockey player and coach
Gašper Kopitar (born 1992), Slovenian ice hockey player
Rok Kopitar (born 1959), Slovenian hurdler

Slovene-language surnames